Bilotti is a surname. Notable people with the surname include:

 Anna Bilotti (born 1982), Italian politician
 Lorenzo Bilotti (born 1994), Italian bobsledder
 Thomas Bilotti (1940–1985), American mobster

See also
 Belotti, a surname
 Billottia, a genus of plants; junior synonym of Calothamnus

Surnames of Italian origin
Italian-language surnames